Tardona is a village in Borsod-Abaúj-Zemplén county, Northern Hungary, about  from the county capital Miskolc.

History

Tardona was first mentioned in written documents in 1240 as Turduna, it was most likely a village of Castle Dédes. During the 14th century, the settlement along with Castle Dédes got into the hands of the Palóczi Family.

Reformed Church of Tardona

The Reformed Church of Tardona was built between 1786 and 1788 with the tower being finished later in 1811. On 19 October 1875, the original Church has burned down along with all the other buildings of the Church.
Most of the important documents about the settlement were kept in the church this event lead to the lack of information about the settlements past.
The church was later rebuilt, and in 1924, its tower was rebuilt to be the today known 24meters tall.

The bells of Tardona 

The larger bell was made by Ráfael Szlezák in 1954. It weighs 206 kg and is 78 cm in diameter. The following is engraved on it:

Which translates to:

The second bell is a smaller one weighing in at 78 kg (54 cm in diameter). It was made by László Szlezák in Budapest.

Memorial room of Mór Jókai

A frequently visited tourist destination is the memorial room of Mór Jókai memorating the time when Mór Jókai was hiding in Tardona during after 1849. The house housing the room was built during the beginning of the 20th century. It is situated across the Reformed Church near the centre of the village. In the room, there are many souvenirs from the period, such as handwritings, books, room furniture and even a safe, which was used by the judge of the village.

Mentions of Tardona in Hungarian literature

 Mór Jókai: A tengerszemű hölgy (Eyes like the Sea)
 Mór Jókai: A barátfalvi lévita
 Béni Balogh: Tardonai papírmalom
 Erzsébet Kertész: A három Róza
 István Jávori: Hármas-forrás

See also

 Miskolc

References

Borsod-Abaúj-Zemplén County